Turn Against This Land is the debut album from the London-based band Dogs, released in 2005.

Critical reception
The Guardian wrote that "at times - especially on 'Tarred and Feathered' - the sentiments being expressed somehow manage to sound more vital than the roughly hewn punk-pop used to express them." PopMatters wrote that "there is nothing new or surprising about Dogs." NME wrote that "if it’s bug-eyed reprobates with angry hearts powering aneurysm-inducing buzzsaw pop [that you are seeking], then you’ve just found your summer’s soundtrack." The Encyclopedia of Popular Music praised the album, writing that it lived up to the hype generated by the band's singles and live show.

Track listing 
 "London Bridge"  (3:41)
 "Selfish Ways"  (3:52)
 "Donkey"  (3:32)
 "End of an Era"  (3:48)
 "She's Got a Reason"  (3:26)
 "It's Not Right"  (3:08)
 "Tuned to a Different Station"  (4:07)
 "Tarred and Feathered"   (3:51)
 "Wait"   (3:53)
 "Heading for an Early Grave"  (3:07)
 "Red"   (5:22)
 "Turn Against This Land"  (1:46)

References

2005 albums
Dogs (British band) albums